Organozinc chemistry is the study of the physical properties, synthesis, and reactions of organozinc compounds, which are organometallic compounds that contain carbon (C) to zinc (Zn) chemical bonds.

Organozinc compounds were among the first organometallic compounds made. They are less reactive than many other analogous organometallic reagents, such as Grignard and organolithium reagents. In 1848 Edward Frankland prepared the first organozinc compound, diethylzinc, by heating ethyl iodide in the presence of zinc metal. This reaction produced a volatile colorless liquid that spontaneous combusted upon contact with air. Due to their pyrophoric nature, organozinc compounds are generally prepared using air-free techniques. They are unstable toward protic solvents. For many purposes they are prepared in situ, not isolated, but many have been isolated as pure substances and thoroughly characterized.

Organozincs can be categorized according to the number of carbon substituents that are bound to the metal.
 Diorganozinc: A class of organozinc compounds in which two alkyl ligands. These may be further divided into subclasses depending on the other ligands attached 
 Heteroleptic (RZnX): Compounds which an electronegative or monoanionic ligand (X), such as a halide, is attached to the zinc center with another alkyl or aryl substituent (R).
 Ionic organozinc compounds: This class is divided into organozincates and organozinc cations.

Bonding
In its coordination complexes zinc(II) adopts several coordination geometries, commonly octahedral, tetrahedral, and various pentacoordinate geometries. These structural flexibility can be attributed to zinc's electronic configuration [Ar]3d104s2. The 3d orbital is filled, and therefore, ligand field effects are nonexistent. Coordination geometry is thus determined largely by electrostatic and steric interactions. Organozinc compounds usually are two- or three-coordinate, reflecting the strongly donating property of the carbanionic ligands.

Typical diorganozinc complexes have the formula R2Zn. Dialkylzinc compounds are monomeric with a linear coordination at the zinc atom. A polar covalent bond exists between carbon and zinc, being polarized toward carbon due to the differences in electronegativity values (carbon: 2.5 & zinc: 1.65). The dipole moment of symmetric diorganozinc reagents can be seen as zero in these linear complexes, which explains their solubility in nonpolar solvents like cyclohexane. Unlike other binary metal alkyls, the diorganozinc species show a low affinity for complexation with ethereal solvent. Bonding in R2Zn is described as employing sp-hybridized orbitals on Zn.

These structures cause zinc to have two bonding d-orbitals and three low-lying non-bonding d-orbitals (see non-bonding orbital), which are available for binding. When zinc lacks electron donating ligands it is unable to obtain coordination saturation, which is a consequence of the large atomic radius and low electron deficiency of zinc. Therefore, it is rare for bridging alkyl or aryl groups to occur due to the weak electron deficiency of the zinc atom. Although, it does occur in some cases such as Ph2Zn (Shown below) and which halogens are the organozinc can form metal clusters (see cluster chemistry). When a halogen ligand is added to the zinc atom both the acceptor and donor character of zinc is enhanced allowing for aggregation.

Synthesis
Several methods exist for the generation of organozinc compounds. Commercially available diorganozinc compounds are dimethylzinc, diethylzinc and diphenylzinc. These reagents are expensive and difficult to handle. In one study the active organozinc compound is obtained from much cheaper organobromine precursors:

From zinc metal
Frankland's original synthesis of diethylzinc involves the reaction of ethyl iodide with zinc metal. The zinc must be activated to facilitate this redox reaction. One of such activated form of zinc employed by Frankland is zinc-copper couple.

Riecke zinc, produced by in situ reduction of ZnCl2 with potassium, is another activated form of zinc. This form has proven useful for reactions such as Negishi coupling and Fukuyama coupling. Formation of organozinc reagents is facilitated for alkyl or aryl halides bearing electron-withdrawing substituents, e.g., nitriles and esters.

Functional group exchange
The two most common zinc functional group interconversion reactions are with halides and boron, which is catalyzed by copper iodide (CuI) or base. The boron intermediate is synthesized by an initial hydroboration reaction followed by treatment with diethyl zinc. This synthesis shows the utility of organozinc reagents by displaying high selectivity for the most reactive site in the molecule, as well as creating useful coupling partners.

This group transfer reaction can be used in allylation, or other coupling reactions (such as Negishi coupling).

β-Silyl diorganozinc compounds
One of the major drawbacks of diorganozinc alkylations is that only one of the two alkyl substituents is transferred. This problem can be solved by using Me3SiCH2- (TMSM), which is a non-transferable group.

Transmetallation
Transmetallation is similar to the interconversions displayed above zinc can exchange with other metals such as mercury, lithium, copper, etc. One example of this reaction is the reaction of diphenylmercury with zinc metal to form diphenylzinc and metallic mercury:

The benefit of transmetalling to zinc it is often more tolerant of other functional groups in the molecule due to the low reactivity which increases selectivity.
In the synthesis of Maoecrystal V, a directed ortho metalation gives the initial aryl-lithium species, which is transmetallated to the desired arylzinc compound. The arylzinc compound is significantly less reactive than the aryl-lithium species and thus better tolerates the functionality in the subsequent coupling with methyl chlorooxaloacetate. Esters are significantly stable against organozinc reagents.

Organozinc can be obtained directly from zinc metal: 

In this method zinc is activated by 1,2-dibromoethane and trimethylsilyl chloride. A key ingredient is lithium chloride which quickly forms a soluble adduct with the organozinc compound thus removing it from the metal surface.

Reactions
In many of their reactions organozincs appear as intermediates.
 In the Frankland–Duppa reaction (1863) an oxalate ester (ROCOCOOR) reacts with an alkyl halide R'X, zinc and hydrochloric acid to the α-hydroxycarboxylic esters RR'COHCOOR

Reformatsky reaction
This organic reaction can be employed to convert α-haloester and ketone or aldehyde to a β-hydroxyester. Acid is needed to protonate the resulting alkoxide during work up. The initial step is an oxidative addition of zinc metal into the carbon-halogen bond, thus forming a carbon-zinc enolate. This C-Zn enolate can then rearrange to the Oxygen-Zinc enolate via coordination. Once this is formed the other carbonyl containing starting material will coordinate in the manner shown below and give the product after protonation. The benefits of the Reformatsky reaction over the conventional aldol reaction protocols is the following:
 Allows for exceedingly derivatized ketone substrates 
 The ester enolate intermediate can be formed in the presence of enolizable moieties 
 Well suited for intramolecular reactions
Below shows the six-membered transition state of the Zimmerman–Traxler model (Chelation Control, see Aldol reaction), in which R3 is smaller than R4.

The Reformatsky reaction has been employed in numerous total syntheses such as the synthesis of C(16),C(18)-bis-epi-cytochalasin D:

The Reformatsky reaction even allows for with zinc homo-enolates. A modification of the Reformatsky reaction is the Blaise reaction.

Simmons–Smith reaction
The Simmons–Smith reagent is used to prepare cyclopropanes from olefin using methylene iodide as the methylene source. The reaction is effected with zinc. The key zinc-intermediate formed is a carbenoid (iodomethyl)zinc iodide which reacts with alkenes to afford the cyclopropanated product. The rate of forming the active zinc species is increased via ultrasonication since the initial reaction occurs at the surface of the metal.

Although the mechanism has not been fully elaborated it is hypothesized that the organozinc intermediate is a metal-carbenoid. The intermediate is believed to be a three-centered "butterfly-type". This intermediate can be directed by substituents, such as alcohols, to deliver the cyclopropane on the same side of the molecule. Zinc-copper couple is commonly used to activate zinc.

Titanium–zinc methylenation
Organozinc compounds derived from methylene bromide or iodide can electrophilically add to carbonyl groups to form terminal alkenes. The reaction is mechanistically related to the Tebbe reaction and can be catalyzed by various Lewis acids (e.g. TiCl4 or Al2Me6). The reaction is used to introduce deuterium into molecules for isotopic labeling or as an alternative to the Wittig reaction.

Negishi coupling
This powerful carbon-carbon bond forming cross-coupling reactions combines an organic halide and an organozinc halide reagent in the presence of a nickel or palladium catalyst. The organic halide reactant can be alkenyl, aryl, allyl, or propargyl. Alkylzinc coupling with alkyl halides such as bromides and chlorides have also been reported with active catalysts such as Pd-PEPPSI precatalysts, which strongly resist beta-hydride elimination (a common occurrence with alkyl substituents). Either diorganic species or organozinc halides can be used as coupling partners during the transmetallation step in this reaction. Despite the low reactivity of organozinc reagents on organic electrophiles, these reagents are among the most powerful metal nucleophiles toward palladium.

Alkylzinc species require the presence of at least a stoichiometric amount of halide ions in solution to form a "zincate" species of the form RZnX32−, before it can undergo transmetalation to the palladium centre. This behavior contrasts greatly with the case of aryl zinc species. A key step in the catalytic cycle is a transmetalation in which a zinc halide exchanges its organic substituent for another halogen with the metal center.

An elegant example of Negishi coupling is Furstner's synthesis of amphidinolide T1:

Fukuyama coupling
Fukuyama coupling is a palladium-catalyzed reaction involving the coupling of an aryl, alkyl, allyl, or α,β- unsaturated thioester compound. This thioester compound can be coupled to a wide range of organozinc reagents in order to reveal the corresponding ketone product. This protocol is useful due to its sensitivity to functional groups such as ketone, acetate, aromatic halides, and even aldehydes. The chemoselectivity observed indicates ketone formation is more facile than oxidative addition of palladium into these other moieties.

A further example of this coupling method is the synthesis of (+)-biotin. In this case, the Fukuyama coupling takes place with the thiolactone:

Barbier reaction
The Barbier reaction involves nucleophilic addition of a carbanion equivalent to a carbonyl. The conversion is similar to the Grignard reaction. The organozinc reagent is generated via an oxidative addition into the alkyl halide. The reaction produces a primary, secondary, or tertiary alcohol via a 1,2-addition. The Barbier reaction is advantageous because it is a one-pot process: the organozinc reagent is generated in the presence of the carbonyl substrate. Organozinc reagents are also less water sensitive, thus this reaction can be conducted in water. Similar to the Grignard reaction, a Schlenk equilibrium applies, in which the more reactive dialkylzinc can be formed.

The mechanism resembles the Grignard reaction, in which the metal alkoxide can be generated by a radical stepwise pathway, through single electron transfer, or concerted reaction pathway via a cyclic transition state. An example of this reaction is in Danishefsky's synthesis of cycloproparadicicol. By using the organozinc addition reaction conditions the other functionality of the dienone and the alkyne are tolerated:

Zinc acetylides
The formation of the zinc acetylide proceeds via the intermediacy of a dialkynyl zinc (functional group exchange). Catalytic processes have been developed such as Merck's ephedrine process. Propargylic alcohols can be synthesized from zinc acetylides. These versatile intermediates can then be used for a wide range of chemical transformations such as cross-coupling reactions, hydrogenation, and pericyclic reactions.

In the absence of ligands, the reaction is slow and inefficient. In the presence of chiral ligands, the reaction is fast and gives high conversion. Ryoji Noyori determined that a monozinc-ligand complex is the active species.

Diastereoselectivity for addition of organozinc reagents into aldehydes can be predicted by the following model by Noyori and David A. Evans:

The α-stereocenter of the ligand dictates observed stereochemistry of the propargylic alcohols
The steric effects between the aldehyde substituent and the ligand are less important but still dictate the favored conformation

Zinc-acetylides are used in the HIV-1 reverse transcriptase inhibitor Efavirenz as well as in Merck's ephedrine derivatives .

Organozincates
The first organozinc ate complex (organozincate) was reported in 1858 by James Alfred Wanklyn, an assistant to Frankland and concerned the reaction of elemental sodium with diethylzinc:

Organozinc compounds that are strongly Lewis acidic are vulnerable to nucleophilic attack by alkali metals, such as sodium, and thus form these 'ate compounds'. Two types of organozincates are recognized: tetraorganozincates ([R4Zn]M2), which are dianionic, and triorganozincates ([R3Zn]M), which are monoanionic. Their structures, which are determined by the ligands, have been extensively characterized.

Synthesis
Tetraorganozincates such as [Me4Zn]Li2 can be formed by mixing Me2Zn and MeLi in a 1:2 molar ratio of the rectants. Another example synthetic route to forming spriocyclic organozincates is shown below:

Triorganozincates compounds are formed by treating a diorganozinc such as (Me3SiCH2)2Zn with an alkali metal (K), or an alkali earth metal (Ba, Sr, or Ca). One example is [(Me3SiCH2)3Zn]K.
Triethylzincate degrades to sodium hydridoethylzincate(II) as a result of beta-hydride elimination:

The product is an edge-shared bitetrahedral structure, with bridging hydride ligands.

Reactions
Although less commonly studied, organozincates often have increased reactivity and selectivity compared to the neutral diorganozinc compounds. They have been useful in stereoselective alkylations of ketones and related carbonyls, ring opening reactions. Aryltrimethylzincates participate in vanadium mediated C-C forming reactions.

Organozinc(I) compounds
Low valent organozinc compounds having a Zn–Zn bond are also known. The first such compound, decamethyldizincocene, was reported in 2004.

See also 
 Compounds of zinc

References

External links
Zinc in organic synthesis
Organozinc Compounds produced by BASF Corporation